Berlant is a surname. Notable people with the surname include: 

Kate Berlant (born 1987), American comedian, actress, and writer
Lauren Berlant (1957–2021), American cultural theorist and author
Tony Berlant (born 1941), American artist